The Cotswolds Distillery was established in 2014, and is one of the few distilleries producing English whisky.

Initial development of the distillery was assisted by Harry Cockburn (a Master Distiller and former Production Director at Bowmore distillery) and Dr. Jim Swan (an expert in cask maturation whose previous projects include work with Penderyn in Wales, Kavalan in Taiwan and The Milk & Honey Distillery in Israel). Production began on 5 September 2014, with the first cask of single malt whisky filled on 22 September 2014. The first release of whisky (4000 bottles), when a selection of casks had reached the three-year minimum age, took place in October 2017.

Crowd funding 
In January 2016, the Distillery opened a crowd funding initiative on CrowdBnk with the aim of raising £500,500 for expansion of the business. The investment window closed with the initiative having raised £1,001,000 from 124 investors in seven weeks.

In June 2018, £3 million were raised on Crowdcube for a visitor centre. In January 2020, the company raised £1 million.

Technical specifications 
The distillery features a 0.5 tonne mash tun and eight 2,500-litre washbacks. The distillation takes place in two copper pot stills supplied by Forsyths of Rothes, Scotland. 

The gin is produced on a 500-litre hybrid pot and column still made by Arnold Holstein GmbH of Markdorf, Germany. Using just the pot still section of the still, the gin is rectified using the 'steep and boil' method, and the gin is collected in one shot, as opposed to the multi-shot method traditionally used by larger gin brands.
With this procedure, Cotswolds distillery produce seven kinds of gin:

 Dry Gin
 Old Tom Gin
 Wildflower (three varieties)
 Hedgerow
 1616 Barrel-aged
 Christmas

The company added, in 2020, a liqueur to its product range.

Reception and awards 
The Cotswolds Distillery receives 15,000 visitors per year and in 2016 won Best Distillery Tour in the Distillery Experience Awards run by Drinks International, and a Distillery Master award for Consumer Experience from the Spirits Business organisation. The Cotswolds Dry Gin has won a number of awards, including World's Best London Dry Gin at the 2016 World Gin Awards, gold medals at the Berlin and San Francisco World Spirits Competitions, and a Platinum medal at the 2015 Spirits International Prestige Awards.

In the 2016 edition of his Whisky Bible, the whisky writer Jim Murray awarded the new-make spirit that will mature into the Cotswolds Single Malt Whisky 94/100, earning it a 'Liquid Gold' award.

References 

British brands
British companies established in 2014
Companies based in Wiltshire
Distilleries in England
Food and drink companies established in 2014